The Speed of Darkness may refer to:

 The Speed of Darkness (play), a 1989 play by Steve Tesich
 The Speed of Darkness (EP), a 2003 EP from the band Leviathan
 Speed of Darkness, a 2011 album by Flogging Molly
 The Speed of Darkness (book), a 1968 book of poetry by Muriel Rukeyser
 The Speed of Darkness (novel), a 2016 novel by Catherine Fisher

See also
Speed of light (disambiguation)